"Half Way Up" is a song co-written and recorded by American country music singer Clint Black. It was released in November 1996 as the second single from his Greatest Hits compilation album. It peaked at number 6 on the U.S. Billboard Hot Country Singles & Tracks chart and reached number 2 on the Canadian RPM Country Tracks chart. It was written by Black with Hayden Nicholas.

Critical reception
Deborah Evans Price, of Billboard magazine reviewed the song favorably, saying that the song has a "positively insinuating groove." She goes on to say that Black's "textured performance and meaty lyric as calling cards should make it a quick favorite."

Chart positions
"Half Way Up" debuted at number 47 on the U.S. Billboard Hot Country Singles & Tracks for the week of November 30, 1996.

Year-end charts

References

1996 singles
Clint Black songs
Songs written by Clint Black
Songs written by Hayden Nicholas
Song recordings produced by James Stroud
RCA Records Nashville singles
1996 songs